Macario is a Spanish, Portuguese, Italian, and Filipino name.  It may refer to:

People
 Catarina Macario, Brazilian-American footballer
 Erminio Macario, Italian actor and comedian
 Macario Peralta, Jr., Filipino soldier and lawyer 
 Macario Sakay, Filipino general 
 Mig Macario, Filipino-Canadian actor
 William Macario, Brazilian mixed martial artist

Other
 Macario (film), a 1960 Mexican film

See also 

 Macarius, the Latin version of the name
 Makarios, the Greek version of the name

Italian masculine given names
Portuguese masculine given names
Spanish masculine given names